Bryan Joseph Bayda  (born August 21, 1961 in Saskatoon, Saskatchewan) is the bishop of the Eparchy of Toronto and Eastern Canada in the Ukrainian Greek Catholic Church. 

Bayda was born in Saskatoon on August 21, 1961. Upon completing high school at St. Vladimir's College Minor Seminary in Roblin, Manitoba, he pursued studies at the University of St. Michael's College in Toronto, where he obtained a Bachelor of Arts in philosophy in 1982 and a Master of Divinity in 1987. Further studies included a Bachelor of Education from the University of Manitoba in 1990 and a Diploma in Eastern Christian theology from the Sheptytsky Institute in Ottawa in 1997. 

Pope Benedict XVI appointed Bayda as the Eparch of Saskatoon on May 2, 2008. He was appointed Apostolic Administrator of the Eparchy of Toronto and Eastern Canada on November 9, 2019 by Pope Francis. On April 28, 2022, Pope Francis appointed him as bishop of the same eparchy.

References

External links

 

1961 births
Living people
20th-century Eastern Catholic bishops
21st-century Eastern Catholic bishops
Bishops of the Ukrainian Greek Catholic Church
Canadian Eastern Catholics
Canadian members of the Ukrainian Greek Catholic Church
Canadian people of Ukrainian descent
People from Saskatoon
Redemptorist bishops
Ukrainian Catholic Church in Canada
University of St. Michael's College alumni
University of Manitoba alumni
Eastern Catholic bishops in Canada